Farreidae is a family of glass sponges in the order Sceptrulophora.

Taxonomy
Genera in this family include:

 Asceptrulum Duplessis & Reiswig, 2004
 Aspidoscopulia Reiswig, 2002
 Claviscopulia Schulze, 1899
 Farrea Bowerbank, 1862
 Lonchiphora Ijima, 1927

References

Hexactinellida
Sponge families
Taxa named by John Edward Gray